Henry Martin Schmidt   (June 26, 1873 – April 23, 1926) was a professional baseball pitcher for the Brooklyn Superbas during the 1903 season. A star in the minor leagues, he was acquired by Brooklyn and won 22 games during his single season there. The Superbas wanted him back for 1904, but he declined, sending a note to the team (with the unsigned contract for the 1904 season) that declared, "I do not like living in the East and will not report." His 22 wins is the most by a pitcher who only played one Major League season.

He returned to the Pacific Coast League and continued his career in the minors.
After his baseball career he reportedly made a living selling fabrics. He was known throughout Texas as "Flannel".

Henry Schmidt was referenced in the motion picture Off the Black starring Nick Nolte and Timothy Hutton. Nolte shares Schmidt's story as a life lesson with a young man that he has befriended.

External links

References

1873 births
1926 deaths
Major League Baseball pitchers
Baseball players from Texas
Brooklyn Superbas players
Evansville Black Birds players
Mobile Blackbirds players
Richmond Giants players
Lancaster Maroons players
Richmond Bluebirds players
Kansas City Blues (baseball) players
Denver Grizzlies (baseball) players
Wilkes-Barre Coal Barons players
Des Moines Hawkeyes players
Oakland Commuters players
Oakland Clamdiggers players
Oakland Oaks (baseball) players
San Jose (minor league baseball) players
Fresno Raisin Eaters players
Los Angeles Angels (minor league) players
Mobile Sea Gulls players
Nashville Vols players
Greensboro Champs players
Hutchinson Salt Packers players